Val di Chy is a comune (municipality) in the Metropolitan City of Turin in the Italian region Piedmont. It was created in January 2019 with the merger of the former comuni of Pecco, Alice Superiore and Lugnacco.

References

External links
 Official website